Steinwiesen is a market town and municipality in the district of Kronach in Bavaria, Germany about 100 km slightly east of due north of Nuremberg, and about 10 km northeast of Kronach.

The name Steinwiesen appears for the first time in the year 1323 authentic in history. In 1386 the rafters business in the Frankenwald was first mentioned. Steinwiesen obtained market privileges in 1743 through Friedrich Karl, bishop to Bamberg and Würzburg. With directive of April 1937, the governor of Bavaria, knight Franz of Epp lent the community of Steinwiesen the right to lead an own crest. The community flag with three strips in the sequence red-white-green was approved 1968 by Bavarian Interior Ministry.

Notable people
 Josef Müller, German Resistance member and founder of the Christian Social Union in Bavaria

References

Kronach (district)